Stražica Lighthouse on the island of Prvić in the Adriatic Sea was built in 1875 and consists of a small stone house and a  tall lighthouse tower. A crew of lightkeepers were stationed on the island until it was made fully automated in 1974. In 1993 the natural gas-powered system was replaced with solar panels and is today remotely controlled by Plovput, the state-owned company for maritime traffic which controls the entire network of Croatian lighthouses.

See also
List of lighthouses in Croatia

Notes

Lighthouses completed in 1875
Lighthouses in Croatia
Buildings and structures in Primorje-Gorski Kotar County